Charlie Wilson's War may refer to: 

The efforts of U.S. Representative Charlie Wilson (D-TX) to help the Afghan Mujahideen fight Soviet forces through...
...the CIA's Operation Cyclone, the official name of the covert war itself
Charlie Wilson's War: The Extraordinary Story of the Largest Covert Operation in History, a 2003 book by George Crile III documenting the above events
Charlie Wilson's War (film), a 2007 film directed by Mike Nichols based on the book